Glenn Ray Davis Jr. (born October 19, 1973) is an American politician from Virginia. Davis is a member of the Republican Party and is currently representing the Virginia House of Delegates 84th district.

Early life and education 
Glenn Davis was born and raised in Norfolk, Virginia.

He attended George Mason University 1991 to 1993 and received a B.A. in economics there. He enrolled in the Massachusetts Institute of Technology  Masters program from 2007 to 2010 with a concentration in organizational leadership.

Political career
Davis was elected to City of Virginia Beach City Council - Rose Hall District on November 4, 2008 defeating an incumbent first elected 28 years prior.  Davis was re-elected to the city council on November 6, 2012.

Davis was elected to the House of Delegates in the November 2013 elections. Davis serves on the Education, Transportation, and General Laws Committees. Davis is also Vice-Chairman of the Joint Commission on Technology and Science (JCOTS) and chaired its Cybersecurity and Blockchain subcommittees. He is also a member of the Business Development, and Virginia Tourism Caucuses.

In March 2016, Davis announced that he was joining the race for Lieutenant Governor of Virginia.  Davis began travelling the state of Virginia campaigning on the message of "Make Virginia #1 Again for Business and Job Growth".  His platform was on tax reform, easing regulations on small businesses, modernizing education and creating 21st century jobs.  During the campaign for Lt. Governor Davis traveled to Estonia to help look at bringing technology jobs to Virginia and traveled to Academic Institutions to look at broader uses for Virginia coal.  Davis lost the Republican Primary for Virginia Lt. Governor taking 3rd place on June 13, 2017.

Davis ran again to be re-elected to his delegate seat and won on November 7, 2017.

In September 2019, Davis listed a $44,000 in-kind contribution from the Democratic Party of Virginia on his campaign finance report, which nearly doubled his reported fundraising for the month of September. His campaign stated that "unethical, dishonest" Democratic mailers against him actually backfired and were beneficial. DPVA spokesman Grant Fox called the move a "gimmick."

Davis won his November 5, 2019 re-election.

On September 10, 2020 Davis announced he would again seek the Republican nomination for Lieutenant Governor of Virginia.

In 2022, Davis was promoted to chair of the Education Committee.

Electoral history

Awards and recognition
In 2014, the Virginia Chamber of Commerce named Glenn "Freshman Legislator of the Year" for his leadership promoting private sector job growth during his first session in the Virginia General Assembly.

In 2015, the Virginia Chamber awarded Glenn their Economic Competitiveness Award and Small Business Advocate Award for his legislation protecting small businesses from costly mandates and helping entrepreneurs attract equity investments.

Personal life
Glenn and his wife, Chelle Davis, live in Virginia Beach and are both active in community and charitable efforts throughout Hampton Roads.

References

External links
 

1973 births
21st-century American politicians
Candidates in the 2021 United States elections
Living people
Republican Party members of the Virginia House of Delegates
Virginia city council members
Politicians from Virginia Beach, Virginia